Benjamin John Hendrickson (born February 4, 1981) is a former baseball pitcher.

Hendrickson was born in St. Cloud, Minnesota, and originally signed with the Milwaukee Brewers in the tenth round of the 1999 First-Year Player Draft.

He struggled in his major league starts in early 2006, twice struggling to get out of the first inning. He was reassigned to Triple-A Nashville on May 21, 2006, after a dismal start against the Twins in which he allowed six runs on five hits and a walk without recording an out. He was the 14th pitcher in Brewers history to fail to record an out in a start and the first since Jamie McAndrew on August 28, . He went 9-8 with Nashville, and was named a Pacific Coast League All-Star. Hendrickson also has 58 innings pitched.

During Spring training , Hendrickson was waived in order for Milwaukee to remove him from their 40-man roster. After clearing waivers, he was again assigned to Nashville, at which point he requested the team trade him. On March 27, Hendrickson was traded to the Kansas City Royals in exchange for catcher Max St. Pierre. After being released by the Royals during  Spring training, Hendrickson signed a minor league contract with the Tampa Bay Rays and became a free agent at the end of the season. In February , he signed a minor league contract with the Minnesota Twins. On June 23, 2009 Hendrickson was released by the Minnesota Twins.

In October of 2018 Hendrickson was charged with cheating a post-baseball employer out of roughly $250,000 while working as its accountant, according to charges.  While working for Floors Northwest in Fridley, MN, Hendrickson would alter the amount of cash received to make it look like less was collected from sales staff. Hendrickson deposited the lower amount and kept the rest. Nearly $160,000 of the money he stole was taken in the final two years of his employment.  He also shifted $10,000 of the company’s money to a personal health care account that paid his medical bills.  Hendrickson admitted to police that he stole from the company, but thought the total was between $50,000 and $75,000. He said he took the money “to help pay bills as he was working paycheck to paycheck and not getting ahead.”

References

External links

Minor League Splits and Situational Stats
Omaha Storm Chasers Player Page

1981 births
Living people
Baseball players from Minnesota
Beloit Snappers players
Durham Bulls players
High Desert Mavericks players
Indianapolis Indians players
Leones del Caracas players
American expatriate baseball players in Venezuela
Major League Baseball pitchers
Milwaukee Brewers players
Nashville Sounds players
Ogden Raptors players
Omaha Royals players
People from Bloomington, Minnesota
Peoria Saguaros players
Rochester Red Wings players
Sportspeople from the Minneapolis–Saint Paul metropolitan area